Hamza Hamadou Abdoul Aziz Konkissere (born June 5, 1982, in Niger) is a Nigerien footballer, who currently plays for JS du Ténéré.

Career
The defender has played professional for BEC Tero Sasana FC in the Thailand Premier League.

International career
He is a member of the Niger national football team and made his debut on 31 May 2008 in Kampala against Uganda national football team.

References

1982 births
Living people
Association football forwards
Nigerien footballers
Nigerien expatriate footballers
Abdoul Aziz Hamza
Expatriate footballers in Thailand
Nigerien expatriate sportspeople in Thailand
People from Niamey
Niger international footballers